Bob's Full House was a British television quiz show based on the game of Bingo. It aired on BBC1 from 1 September 1984 until 27 January 1990, and was hosted by Bob Monkhouse.

Gameplay
Four players were given separate Bingo-style cards and attempted to light up the numbers on them by answering questions. Cards had three rows of six spaces each, with one space per row already blanked out to leave 15 numbers showing; however, the numbers in the corners of each card were never blanked out. Numbers on the cards ran from 1 to 60. The winner of each round received their choice of three prizes that increased in value from one round to the next. On charity specials, each correct answer awarded £10 to a charitable cause nominated by the player who gave it.

Each episode began with a lengthy topical stand-up comedy routine from Monkhouse. Throughout the game, he and the players frequently used nicknames for the numbers, some of which became a call-and-response with the audience. For example, choosing 22 would bring a call of "Two little ducks" from Monkhouse and a "Quack, quack" from the audience.

Round One (Four Corners)
In this round, Monkhouse asked 50/50 toss-up questions on the buzzer, open to all. The correct answer allowed a player to light up the number in one corner of their card, while the wrong answer caused them to become penalized, or "wallied" – in this case, unable to buzz-in on the next question. The first player to light all four corners of their card won the round.

Round Two (Monkhouse Master Card/The Middle Line)
The players were shown a board with six categories, each corresponding to a range of 10 consecutive numbers. Each player in turn called a number off their own middle row and was asked a question unopposed in the corresponding category. A correct answer lit the number, but a miss allowed any of the other three to buzz-in (described by Monkhouse as "open to others"). A correct buzz-in allowed that player to light any number on their own middle row, while a miss caused them to become wallied. If a wallied player was next in line to choose a number, they lost their turn; otherwise, they could not buzz-in on the next question in case of a miss. The categories were changed out after every player had taken a turn, resulting in new ones being added to the board and/or previously used ones being assigned to different number ranges.

The first player to complete their middle row won the round. In addition, one number on each card was secretly designated as a  "Lucky Number." If the player in control chose their own Lucky Number and responded correctly, they won a bonus prize, which was frequently revealed as part of a short comedy sketch or in connection with a worthless joke prize. (E.g. a contestant might win a bag of popcorn and an ice cream cone, then be told that they could enjoy these snacks in combination with a dozen movie tickets.)

Round Three (Full House)
Gameplay proceeded as in Round One, but the goal was now to fill in all unlit numbers on the cards. Numbers were lit starting on a player's top row and proceeding left to right, then similarly on the middle and bottom rows. The first player to complete their card won the game and advanced to the bonus round.

Any players who finished the game without winning any prizes received a hamper of gifts as a consolation prize.

Bonus Round (Golden Card Game)
The player faced an electronic board laid out in the same manner as the cards used in the main game, with one space in each row marked off and numbers from 1 to 60 in the others. They had 60 seconds to answer up to 15 questions. The clock kept running on a pass or miss, but each correct answer stopped the clock and allowed the player to remove one number. Some numbers had letters hidden behind them that spelled out the name of a holiday destination, while all others added their value in pounds to a bank. If the player uncovered all the letters, they won a holiday to that destination; if not, they received a small consolation prize. Regardless of the outcome, they won all the money in the bank.

Monkhouse frequently offered subtle hints to help players who were struggling with questions, such as bleating like a goat on an astrology-related question to lead a player to the sign of Capricorn. The letters were arranged in order from left to right in each row, and a player who figured out the destination could narrow down the possible locations of the missing letters.

Transmissions

Series

Specials

Later versions

The show's format was revived twice on UK television after the original Monkhouse version, although with a different title and host.  One To Win ran on BBC1 for one series between 1991 and 1992 for one series, and was hosted by Andrew O'Connor; maintaining the original format of Bob's Full House largely unaltered.

Lucky Numbers ran on ITV between 1995 and 1997 (hosted by Shane Richie), and preserved the three basic rounds of Bob's Full House, but the bonus round was replaced by a different game where the contestant had to gamble their winnings from the main game. Lucky Numbers also had a viewer participation element where cash prizes were played for in a tabloid newspaper bingo game in tandem with the numbers called in the show for that week.

International versions

Video games
A home computer adaptation by Domark was released in 1988 for the ZX Spectrum, Amstrad CPC, BBC Micro and Commodore 64.

References

External links
.
Bob's Full House at BFI.
.

BBC television game shows
1984 British television series debuts
1990 British television series endings
1980s British game shows
1990s British game shows
Bingo